Aditya Mishra (born 11 June 1981 in New Delhi, India) is an American cricketer of Indian origin who represents and played for the United States national cricket team. He was named vice-captain of 2012 ICC World Twenty20 Qualifier. He retired at age of 31 with five List A and 8 Twenty20 to his name.

References

1981 births
Living people
American cricketers
American cricket captains
Karnataka cricketers
People from New Delhi
American sportspeople of Indian descent